Joseph Malkin was a professional rugby league footballer who played in the 1920s and 1930s. He played at club level for Castleford (Heritage №).

Playing career

County League appearances
Joseph Malkin played in Castleford's victory in the Yorkshire County League during the 1932–33 season.

Club career
Joseph Malkin made his début  for Castleford in the 0-22 defeat by Hull F.C. on Saturday 28 August 1926.

References

External links
Search for "Malkin" at rugbyleagueproject.org
Joe Malkin Memory Box Search at archive.castigersheritage.com

Castleford Tigers players
English rugby league players
Place of birth missing
Place of death missing
Year of birth missing
Year of death missing